Online video platforms allow users to upload, share videos or live stream their own videos to the Internet. These can either be for the general public to watch, or particular users on a shared network. The most popular video hosting website is YouTube, 2 billion active until October 2020 and the most extensive catalog of online videos. There are some countries in the world placing restrictions on YouTube, instead having their own regional video sharing websites.

Notable examples

Specifically dedicated video hosting websites 

 * Website predominantly hosts live streaming video.

Websites dedicated to adult and pornographic video sharing

Larger websites which allow the hosting of videos

Discontinued

White-label providers 
White-label providers sell the technology to various parties that allow them to create the services of the aforementioned "User Generated Video Sharing" websites with the client's brand. Just as Akamai and other companies host and manage video/image/audio for many companies, these white-labels "host video content." A few of these companies also offer their own user-generated video sharing website both for commercial purposes and to show off their platform. Websites in this category include:
 Dailymotion Cloud
 VHX, which was absorbed by Vimeo in 2018

Enterprise providers 
Listed here are video hosting providers exclusively serving businesses wanting to share video content internally with employees or externally with customers, partners, or prospects. Features may include limiting access to authenticated users, tracking of user actions, integration with single sign-on services and a lack of the advertisements normally present on public sites. Among sites in this category are:

 Brightcove
 DaCast
 Dailymotion Cloud
 JW Player
 Kaltura
 Kewego
 MediaCore
 MetaCDN
 Microsoft Stream
 Ooyala
 Panopto
 Qumu
 Rumble.com
 thePlatform
 Shift72
 Ustream
 ViaStreaming
 Viddler
 Vidyard

Open source 
 GNU MediaGoblin (software)
 PeerTube
 Plumi (software to create video sharing sites)

Web-based video editing 
Web-based video editing sites generally offer the "user generated video sharing" website in addition to some form of editing application. Some of these applications simply allow the user to crop a video into a smaller clip. Other services have invested much time and effort into replicating the same functionality that has previously only been available via Windows Movie Maker, iMovie and other client-side applications that run outside of a web page. Some of these applications are based in AJAX and others in Flash. Some of these websites may additionally offer downloadable editors; however, this is not a desktop- but a web-based video editor list. Websites in this category include:
Animoto
Clesh
Dailymotion
Blackbird
Jaycut (No longer available for PC)
Magisto
Pixorial
WeVideo
Tribute (website)

See also 
 Comparison of video hosting services
 List of educational video websites
 List of Internet television providers
 Online video platform

References 

Video hosting
video hosting services